The Clown Died in Marvin Gardens is the second album from Beacon Street Union, a psychedelic rock group based in Boston, Massachusetts. The album was released in 1968. The dead clown on the cover was also used previously in 1967, by Joel Brodsky on The Doors's album Strange Days.

Track listing
 "The Clown Died in Marvin Gardens"
 "The Clown's Overture"
 "Angus of Aberdeen"
 "Blue Suede Shoes"
 "A Not Very August Afternoon"
 "Now I Taste the Tears"
 "King of the Jungle"
 "May I Light Your Cigarette"
 "Baby, Please Don't Go"

Personnel

 John Lincoln Wright - vocals
 Paul Tartachny - guitars
 Robert Rhodes - keyboards, brass
 Wayne Ulaky - bass
 Richard Weisberg - drums

Beacon Street Union albums
1968 albums
MGM Records albums